Bronwen Mantel (born 29 October 1948) is a Canadian actress. Mantel has appeared in numerous movies and has done extensive voice acting in animated films and television series.

Early life and career
Mantel was born in Montreal, Quebec, Canada. She has appeared in several movies including Secret Window and Gothika, and as a voice actress in the TV series Mega Babies, Adventures of the Little Koala, Arthur, Bobobobs, Tripping the Rift, Sharky and George, The Wonderful Wizard of Oz, Papa Beaver's Storytime, A Bunch of Munsch, Young Robin Hood, The Smoggies, Princess Sissi, What's with Andy?, Christopher Columbus, Adventures of the Little Mermaid, Adventures of Pinocchio, Caillou, The Little Lulu Show, Cat Tales, The World of David the Gnome, Spirou, Anna Banana, Diplodos, Nutsberry Town, Lucky Luke, C.L.Y.D.E., Jungle Tales, The Country Mouse and the City Mouse Adventures, Pig City, Wunschpunsch, Sea Dogs, A Miss Mallard Mystery, Woofy, Fred the Caveman, Bob in a Bottle, Jim Button, The Tofus, The Kids from Room 402, Night Hood, Flight Squad, Ivanhoe, Bumpety Boo, Oscar and Spike, Ocean Tales, The Magical Adventures of Quasimodo, Creepschool, Mica, Belphegor, Zoe and Charlie, Gino the Chicken, Pet Pals, The Twins, Marsupilami, Wombat City, Mona the Vampire, Zoé Kezako, The Babaloos, Robinson Sucroe, My Goldfish is Evil, Inuk, Ripley's Believe It or Not!, Chip and Charlie, The Babaloos, Sagwa, the Chinese Siamese Cat, The Real Story of, Tommy and Oscar, Samurai Pizza Cats, Malo Korrigan, Turtle Island, Milo, Lola and Virginia, Dragon Hunters, Gofrette, The Legend of White Fang, Adventures of Peter Pan, Gulliver's Travels and Animal Crackers.

She also appears as Bronwyn Mantel.

Partial filmography

Genie Nominee: Best Astress in a non-feature 1980 and Earle Grey Award: BEST ACTRESS, ACTRA Awards 1980

Notes

Sources
 https://web.archive.org/web/20090930075023/http://www.bronwenmantel.com/
 
 http://www.fandango.com/bronwenmantel/filmography/p120797
 http://www.tv.com/bronwen-mantel/person/78198/summary.html
 http://www.hollywood.com/celebrity/Bronwen_Mantel/1407851

1950 births
Anglophone Quebec people
Canadian film actresses
Canadian voice actresses
Living people
Actresses from Montreal
20th-century Canadian actresses
21st-century Canadian actresses